Larom-Welles Cottage is a historic cure cottage located at Saranac Lake in the town of North Elba, Essex and Franklin County, New York.  It was built about 1905 and is a three-story wood-frame structure in the Shingle Style on a stone foundation and surmounted by a metal jerkin head gable roof. It has a two-story wing with a shed roof dormer.  It has a two bay verandah and entrance porch with a second story sleeping porch.  Also on the second floor is a cure porch. It was originally built for the priest of St. Lukes Episcopal Church, later the home of Dr. Edward Welles, a pioneer in thoracic surgery, who practiced at the Adirondack Cottage Sanitarium. The house has been converted to six units.

It was listed on the National Register of Historic Places in 1992.

References

Houses on the National Register of Historic Places in New York (state)
Houses completed in 1905
Houses in Essex County, New York
Shingle Style architecture in New York (state)
National Register of Historic Places in Essex County, New York
1905 establishments in New York (state)